The Consulate General of the United States of America in Kolkata represents the interests of the United States government in Kolkata, India, and nearby surrounding areas. The Consulate General serves the Indian states of West Bengal, Bihar, Jharkhand, Sikkim, Assam, Meghalaya, Tripura, Mizoram, Manipur, Nagaland and Arunachal Pradesh.

Technically, the consulate reports through the U.S. Embassy in New Delhi. The U.S Consulate in Kolkata is the U.S. Department of State's second oldest Consulate and dates from November 19, 1792.

History
The official representation of the U.S. government in India began in November 1792, when the United States's first President, George Washington, nominated Benjamin Joy, of Massachusetts, to be consul. In the 1860s, the Consulate General had under its jurisdiction seven consular agencies: Aden, Akyab, Bassein Chittagong, Cocanada, Moulmein and Rangoon. The Metropolitan Building in Kolkata housed the United States Information Service office till 1991.

During the Vietnam War, the street outside the consulate was renamed after Ho Chi Minh.  In 1995, British journalist John F. Burns characterized it as "one of the most beleaguered American diplomatic posts anywhere."

An increase in the number of information technology (IT) companies in India is leading to an expansion of the consulate.

List of consul generals

 Dean R. Thompson (August 2011–August 2015)
 Patti Hoffman (19 August 2015 – 11 August 2021)
 Melinda Pavek (12 August 2021–present)

2002 attack

The American Cultural Centre at the consulate was attacked on the morning of 22 January 2002 by Islamic militants. The motorcycle-borne attackers killed 5 people, four of which were Kolkata Police constables and one belonged to a private security agency. Two groups claimed responsibility for the attack. A Harkat-ul-Jihad al-Islami member, Farhan Malik, claimed responsibility and said the attack was in protest against "the evil empire of America", while another person claiming to be a member of Asif Raza Commandos, a gang with ties to radical Islamic groups, also claimed responsibility.

See also
 Embassy of the United States, New Delhi
 Consulate General of the United States, Chennai
 Consulate General of the United States, Mumbai
Consulate General of the United States, Hyderabad

References

External links
 Official U.S. Consulate General Kolkata website

Diplomatic missions in India
Kolkata CG
India–United States relations
United States
1792 establishments in India